Cosford  is a surname. Notable people with the surname include:
 Becky Cosford (born 1986), Canadian pair skater
 Paul Cosford (1963–2021), British medical administrator